Methylphosphonyl dichloride (DC) or dichloro is an organophosphorus compound. It has a number of commercial uses but is most notable as being a precursor to several chemical weapons agents. It is a white crystalline solid that melts slightly above room temperature.

Synthesis and reactions
Methylphosphonyl dichloride is produced by oxidation of methyldichlorophosphine, with sulfuryl chloride:
CH3PCl2  +  SO2Cl2  →   CH3P(O)Cl2  +  SOCl2

It can also be produced from a range of methylphosphonates (e.g. dimethyl methylphosphonate) via chlorination with thionyl chloride. Various amines catalyse this process.  
With hydrogen fluoride or sodium fluoride, it can be used to produce methylphosphonyl difluoride.  With alcohols, it converts to the dialkoxide:
CH3P(O)Cl2  +  2HOR →   CH3P(O)(OR)2  +  HCl

Safety
Methylphosphonyl dichloride is very toxic and reacts vigorously with water to release hydrochloric acid. It is also listed under Schedule 2 of the Chemical Weapons Convention as it is used in the production of organophosphorus nerve agents such as sarin and soman.

References

Nerve agent precursors
Organophosphorus compounds
Organic compounds with 1 carbon atom